Gregory Wright may refer to:

Gregory Wright (astrophysicist), astrophysicist
Gregory Wright (comics), comic book artist